Aminu Ibrahim Mohammed  (born 27 November  1993) is a Ghanaian International footballer who plays  for Kırşehirspor is in Turkey and is a defensive midfielder.

Club career
Aminu began his club career with Spanish club Rayo Vallecano B. in 2011, after 2 seasons at Rayo Vallecano B, Aminu  joined  Liberty Professionals F.C.
In his homeland Ghana, where he played for 2 seasons. He left Liberty Professionals F.C. in 2016  and joined Turkish club Kırşehirspor is football Club where he signed 2 seasons.

International career
Aminu made his debut for Ghana U20 in 2012.

Style of Play
His game has a particular dependence on sheer strength, power and energy. He can produce the work rate, ball retrieval and attacking willingness of the box-to-box midfielder.

References

External links

Ghanaian footballers
Liberty Professionals F.C. players
Ghanaian expatriate footballers
1993 births
Living people
Footballers from Kumasi
Rayo Vallecano B players
Association football midfielders